Vincenzo Leoni (9 February 1650 – 26 June 1720) was an Italian lawyer and poet, and in 1690 was one of the original founders of the Academy of Arcadia.

He was born to an aristocratic family in Spoleto; he then studied law in Macerata After practicing law in Rome for a few years, he became a writer and founder in the Accademia degli Arcadi (Academy of the Arcadians), aiming to extirpate the ruling taste and oddities introduced into the poetic language. For the academy, he took the name of Uranius Tegeaeus. Some of his elegies were included in Arcadum Carmina, Rome, 1757. Some of his works were published in the second volume of Vite degli Arcadi illustri.

References

External links
 

1650 births
1720 deaths
17th-century Italian poets
17th-century Italian male writers
Italian male poets
Members of the Academy of Arcadians
People from Spoleto
18th-century Italian poets
18th-century Italian male writers
University and college founders